The Mars Hill Network is a network of Christian radio stations in upstate New York.

The first station, WMHR 102.9 FM in Syracuse, New York), went on the air in 1969. In 1988, an additional station WMHN 89.3 FM in Webster, New York, began broadcasting and was joined in 1991 by WMHI 94.7 FM in Cape Vincent, New York, serving Jefferson County and eastern Ontario, WMHQ 90.1 FM in Malone, New York, in 2003, WMHU 91.1 FM, in Cold Brook, New York, in 2011., WMHY 88.5 FM, in Richfield Springs, New York, and WMHH 96.7 FM, in Clifton Park, New York, in 2019.

Other stations

Repeaters 

All call sign meanings are a variation of "Mars Hill."

Translators 
In addition to the main stations, there are 15 translators to relay the network's programming.

See also
 1969 in radio

References

External links 
 
 
 
 

1969 establishments in New York (state)
American companies established in 1969
Mass media companies established in 1969
American radio networks
Christian radio stations in the United States
Religious mass media in the United States
Companies based in Syracuse, New York